Young Men's Christian Association College can mean one of several colleges or universities:

Aurora University in Aurora, Illinois, USA
Osaka Young Men's Christian Association College in Osaka, Japan
Sinclair Community College in Dayton, Ohio, United States